Héctor Salerno  (born ) is a Venezuelan male volleyball player. He was part of the Venezuela men's national volleyball team at the 2014 FIVB Volleyball Men's World Championship in Poland. He played with Aragua VC.

Clubs
 Aragua VC (2014)

References

1991 births
Living people
Venezuelan men's volleyball players
Place of birth missing (living people)
21st-century Venezuelan people